John Mayo may refer to:

 John Mayo (minister) (died 1676), Puritan minister in pre-revolutionary Boston, Massachusetts
 John Mayo (physician) (1761–1818), English doctor
 John Mayo (cricketer) (1822–1899), English cricketer
 John C. C. Mayo (1864–1914), American entrepreneur, educator and politician
 John S. Mayo (born 1930), American engineer